Mesua kochummenia is a species of flowering plant in the family Calophyllaceae. It is endemic to Peninsular Malaysia. It is threatened by habitat loss.

References

kochummenia
Endemic flora of Peninsular Malaysia
Vulnerable plants
Taxonomy articles created by Polbot